Wallis and Futuna competed at the 2015 Pacific Games in Port Moresby, Papua New Guinea from 4 to 18 July 2015. Wallis and Futuna listed 64 competitors as of 4 July 2015. Three competitors were qualified in two sports.

Athletics

Wallis and Futuna qualified two athletes in track and field:
Men
 Vahaafenua Vitolio Tipotio

Parasport
Men
 Lutoviko Halagahu

Golf

Karate

Wallis and Futuna qualified five athletes in karate:
Men
 Francois Heafala
 Paino Talikilagi Mulikihaamea
 Paino Uatini
 Patita Foikoli Vegi
 Willy Tuihihifo Vegi

Outrigger canoeing

Wallis and Futuna qualified 25 athletes in va'a:

Men
 Emile Ofataki Blondel
 Gerard Fuimaono
 Sylvain Kikanoi
 Lemisio Liogi - Mafutuna
 Kusitino Manufekai
 Lolesio Manufekai
 Kevin Pambrun
 Keleto Tauhola
 Jean-Noel Togiaki
 Pelenato Tokotuu
 Jacky Joe Tuakoifenua
 Petelo Tulitau
 Sosefo Tulitau
 Jean Louis Philippe Tuulaki

Women
 Stephane Goepfert
 Mkalita Mailehako Ép. Vehika
 Silivia Mataikamoana Ép. Mavaetau
 Malia Fatima Muni
 Alisone Siuli
 Bernadette Tauhola
 Caroline Tauhola
 Malia Pauahi Tauhola
 Armelle Lotana Togiaki
 Clarisse Faitaliha Tokotuu
 Elisee Tuifalehau Tokotuu

Sailing

Wallis and Futuna qualified two athletes in sailing:

Men
 Corentin Likiliki
 Suliano Takatai

Taekwondo

Wallis and Futuna qualified four athletes in taekwondo:
Men
 Francois Heafala
 Paino Talikilagi Mulikihaamea
 Patita Foikoli Lagafenua Vegi
 Willy Tuihihifo Vegi

Volleyball

Wallis and Futuna qualified men's and women's volleyball teams (total of 24 players):

Men
 Petelo Faipule Kolokilagi
 Petelo Malivao
 Tomaakino Matavalu
 Matahi Christophe Niuliki
 Esekiele Sekeme
 Boris Takaniko
 Meliuahel Maile Maile Toafa Takaniko
 Fagonaatu Taofifenua
 Tali Ite Ofa Tiniloa
 Glenn Tevila Tuifua
 Fakafetai Iseso Fakafetai Tupou
 Vitali Petelo Tupou

Women
 Lita Fenuafanote
 Rose Marie Fiafialoto
 Tekela Fiafialoto
 Malia Lita Tafilagi
 Sperenza Taufana
 Heiata Kulukulu Tauota
 Malia Viane Tauota
 Vaiana-Nui Tauota
 Solen Rowena Tufele
 Samuele Tuia
 Emanuela Elodie Elodie Tupou
 Finau Vakalepu

Weightlifting

Wallis and Futuna qualified four athletes in weightlifting:

Men
 Sikitaki Fulilagi
 Israel Kaikilekofe
 Paulo Keletolona

Women
 Ana Poema Tauhola

Notes

References

2015 in Wallis and Futuna
Nations at the 2015 Pacific Games
Wallis and Futuna at the Pacific Games